(+)-BW373U86 is an opioid analgesic drug used in scientific research.

BW373U86 is a selective agonist for the δ-opioid receptor, with approximately 15x stronger affinity for the δ-opioid than the μ-opioid receptor. It has potent analgesic and antidepressant effects in animal studies. In studies on rats, BW373U86 appears to protect heart muscle cells from apoptosis in conditions of ischemia (oxygen deprivation, such as in heart attack). The mechanism for this is complex and may be separate from its delta agonist effects.

References 

Synthetic opioids
Respiratory agents
Delta-opioid receptor agonists
Phenols
Benzamides
Piperazines
Allyl compounds
Mu-opioid receptor agonists